Engineering is a professional discipline.

Engineering may also refer to:
Engineering (magazine) (established 1866), weekly magazine
Engineering (constituency), an electoral constituency in Hong Kong
Engineering (journal) (established 2015), Chinese journal
Engineering (Scientific Research Publishing journal), predatory journal

See also

Engineer (disambiguation)
List of engineering branches
Outline of engineering